The 1998 Bank of the West Classic was a tennis tournament played on outdoor hard courts at the Taube Tennis Center in Stanford, California in the United States that was part of Tier II of the 1998 WTA Tour. It was the 27th edition of the tournament and was held from July 27 through August 2, 1998. First-seeded Lindsay Davenport won the singles title.

Finals

Singles

 Lindsay Davenport defeated  Venus Williams 6–4, 5–7, 6–4
 It was Davenport's 4th title of the year and the 35th of her career.

Doubles

 Lindsay Davenport /  Natasha Zvereva defeated  Larisa Neiland /  Elena Tatarkova 6–4, 6–4
 It was Davenport's 5th title of the year and the 36th of her career. It was Zvereva's 3rd title of the year and the 76th of her career.

External links
 ITF tournament edition details

Bank of the West Classic
Silicon Valley Classic
Bank of the West Classic
Bank of the West Classic
Bank of the West Classic
Bank of the West Classic